Paraskevas "Paris" Andralas (born 2 December 1978) is a Greek professional football manager and former player.

Honours

 PAS Giannina
Greek Second Division: 2011

References
Profile at epae.org
Guardian Football

1978 births
Living people
Footballers from Piraeus
Proodeftiki F.C. players
PAOK FC players
Levadiakos F.C. players
PAS Giannina F.C. players
Panionios F.C. players
Acharnaikos F.C. players
Super League Greece players
Association football defenders
Association football midfielders
Outfield association footballers who played in goal
Greek football managers
Proodeftiki F.C. managers
Rodos F.C. managers
Fostiras F.C. managers
Greek footballers